Fire & Ice is the third album released by rap group Cali Agents. It was released on November 7, 2006, for Pockets Linted Entertainment.

Track listing
"Intro"- 0:26 
"Fire & Ice"- 2:33 
"The Science"- 4:02 
"Baby Girl"- 4:12 
"Get That Money (feat. Turbin)"- 3:47 
"Interlude"- 0:30 
"Something New"- 3:52 
"Breakadawn"- 3:35 
"What It Is (feat. Concise Kilgore)"- 4:02 
"Hot Ass Summer"- 3:38 
"Interlude"- 0:23 
"Bang"- 3:52 
"Microphone Madness"- 3:59 
"More of the Same/Duck Down"- 9:18

References

2006 albums
Cali Agents albums